The 28th Army Corps was an Army corps in the Imperial Russian Army.

Part of
11th Army: 1914 - 1915
8th Army: 1915
5th Army: 1915
12th Army: 1915
5th Army: 1915 - 1917
1st Army: 1917

Commanders 
 1914-1915 : Nikolai Kashtalinsky
 1915-1917 : Vladimir Alekseevich Slesarenko
 1917- ?   : Mikhail Mikhailovich Butchik

Reference 

Corps of the Russian Empire